Roger Peyrefitte (17 August 1907 – 5 November 2000) was a French diplomat, writer of bestseller novels and non-fiction, and a defender of gay rights and pederasty.

Life and work
Born in Castres, Tarn, to a middle class bourgeois family, Peyrefitte went to Jesuit and Lazarist boarding schools and then studied language and literature in the University of Toulouse. After graduating first of his year from Institut d'Études Politiques de Paris in 1930, he worked as an embassy secretary in Athens between 1933 and 1938. Back in Paris, he had to resign in 1940 for personal reasons before being reintegrated in 1943 and finally ending his diplomatic career in 1945. In his novels, he often treated controversial themes and his work put him at odds with the Roman Catholic church.

He wrote openly about his homoerotic experiences in boarding school in his 1943 first novel Les amitiés particulières which won the coveted prix Renaudot in 1944. The book was made into a film of the same name  which was released in 1964. On the set, Peyrefitte met the 12-year-old Alain-Philippe Malagnac d'Argens de Villèle; and both fell in love. Peyrefitte tells the story of their relationship in Notre amour ("Our Love" – 1967) and L'Enfant de cœur ("Child of the Heart" – 1978).  Malagnac later married performer Amanda Lear.

A cultivator of scandal, Peyrefitte attacked the Vatican and Pope Pius XII in his book Les Clés de saint Pierre (1953), which earned him the nickname of "Pope of the Homosexuals". The publication of the book started a bitter quarrel with François Mauriac. Mauriac threatened to resign from the paper he was working with at the time, L'Express, if it did not stop carrying advertisements for the book. The quarrel was exacerbated by Mauriac's articles attacking the memory of Jean Cocteau because of his homosexuality and the release of the film adaptation of Les amitiés particulières. This culminated in a virulent open letter by Peyrefitte in which he accused Mauriac of being a hypocrite, a fake heterosexual who maligned his own children and a closeted homosexual with a past. It is said Mauriac was badly shaken by this letter, unable to get out of bed for a whole week.

In April 1976, after Pope Paul VI had condemned pre-marital sex, masturbation and homosexuality in the encyclical Persona Humana: Declaration on Certain Questions Concerning Sexual Ethics, in a series of interviews Peyrefitte accused him of being a closet homosexual that chose his papal name after his lover's first name. Although his statements were published in a few discreet magazines, Peyrefitte was surprised and overjoyed when one day he watched in television the Pope addressing the issue in the heart of St. Peter's Square, complaining about the "horrible and slanderous insinuations" that were being said about the Holy Father and appealing for prayers on his behalf.

In Les Ambassades (1951), he revealed the ins and outs of diplomacy. Peyrefitte also wrote a book full of gossip about Baron Jacques d'Adelswärd-Fersen's exile in Capri (L'Exilé de Capri, 1959) and translated Greek gay love poetry (La Muse garçonnière (The Boyish Muse), Flammarion, 1973).

In his memoirs, Propos Secrets, he wrote extensively about his youth, his sex life (pederastic mainly and a few affairs with women), his years as a diplomat, his travels to Greece and Italy and his troubles with the police for sexually harassing male teenagers. He also gave vent to his fierce love of snobbish genealogizing and vitriolic well-documented gossip, writing about famous people of his time such as André Gide, Henry de Montherlant, François Mauriac, André Malraux, Jean Cocteau, Jean Genet, Marcel Jouhandeau, Marie-Laure de Noailles, Gaston Gallimard, Jean-Paul Sartre, Charles de Gaulle, Giscard d'Estaing, Georges Pompidou, among many others. Claiming he had reliable sources within the Vatican's "black aristocracy", once again he stated that three recent popes of the 20th century were homosexuals: Pius XII, John XXIII and Paul VI. He particularly loved to expose the hypocrisy and vanity of prominent people, to denounce fake aristocrats and to out closeted homosexuals.

Roger Peyrefitte wrote popular historical biographies about Alexander the Great and Voltaire. In Voltaire et Frédéric II he claimed that Voltaire had been the passive lover of Frederick the Great.

In spite of his libertarian views on sexuality, politically Peyrefitte was a conservative bourgeois and in his later years he supported the far-right politician Jean-Marie Le Pen.

He died of Parkinson's disease at age 93.

Legacy 

After his death, the city of Capri dedicated a plaque to him which is mounted near Villa Lysis and the inscription of which reads: A Roger Peyrefitte autore de L'esule di Capri per aver esaltato e diffuso il mito, la cultura e la bellezza dell'isola nel mondo. — "For Roger Peyrefitte, author of L'Exile de Capri, for having exalted and diffused the myth, the culture, and the beauty of this island in the world."

In a 2012 essay about the importance of public libraries, English actor and writer Stephen Fry mentions that Peyrefitte's novels The Exile of Capri and Special Friendships were "unforgettable, transformative books" for him.

Press cuttings

Obituary in The Times, 7 November 2000, page 25. "In the minds of many, Roger Peyrefitte's reputation as a genuinely literary novelist is based on Les Amitiés Particulières (1944), which was also his first. He wrote many others, but none really matched the literary merit of the first, and the author seemed increasingly to seek a succès de scandale rather than any serious critical consideration."
Obituary by James Kirkup in The Independent: The Tuesday Review, 7 November 2000, page 6. "Peyrefitte was a skilled manipulator of the media. He was charismatic to the point of absurdity, with his dramatic gestures and outrageous behaviour, so that in the end no one took any notice of his often ludicrous fabrications, though they were always delivered with great style and conviction, and with an effrontery that was amusingly malicious...Peyrefitte acknowledges the courage of his great predecessors André Gide, Marcel Proust, Jean Cocteau and Oscar Wilde, while regretting the timidity of Marcel Jouhandeau and many of the contemporary French writers, whether gay or straight, in pursuing the cause of homosexual (and heterosexual) rights."
Obituary by Douglas Johnson in The Guardian, 15 November 2000, page 24. "André Gide, who had attempted to defend homosexuality in a much earlier work, was prophetic in his congratulations to Peyrefitte. He did not think that Les Amitiés Particulières would win the Goncourt prize, but he did believe it would still be read a century later."

Bibliography
Les Amitiés particulières, novel, Editions Flammarion 1944  (English translations as Special Friendships by Felix Giovanelli 1950 & Edward Hyams 1958)
Mademoiselle de Murville, novel, Editions Jean Vigneau 1947
Le Prince des neiges, drama in 3 acts, Editions Jean Vigneau 1947
L'Oracle, novel, Editions Jean Vigneau 1948 (definitive edition 1974)
Les Amours singulières, novel, Editions Jean Vigneau 1949
La Mort d'une mère, Editions Flammarion 1950
Les Ambassades, novel, Editions Flammarion 1951 (English translation 1953 by James FitzMaurice as Diplomatic Diversions)
Les Œuvres libres - Roger Peyrefitte, etc. Editions Arthème Fayard 1951
Du Vésuve à l'Etna, travelogue, Editions Flammarion 1952  (English translation 1954 by John McEwen as South from Naples)
La Fin des ambassades, novel, Editions Flammarion 1953 (English translation 1954 by Edward Hyams as Diplomatic Conclusions)
Les Amours, de Lucien de Samosate (translation of the original Greek), Editions Flammarion 1954
Les Clés de saint Pierre, novel, Editions Flammarion 1955 (English translation 1957 by Edward Hyams as The Keys of St. Peter)
Jeunes Proies, Editions Flammarion 1956
Les Chevaliers de Malte, Editions Flammarion 1957
L'Exilé de Capri, Editions Flammarion 1959  (English translation 1961 by Edward Hyams as The Exile of Capri)
Le Spectateur nocturne, dramatic dialogue, Editions Flammarion 1960
Les Fils de la lumière, study of Free-Masonry, Editions Flammarion 1961
La Nature du Prince, Editions Flammarion 1963
Les Secrets des conclaves, Editions Flammarion 1964
Les Juifs, Editions Flammarion 1965
Notre Amour, Editions Flammarion 1967
Les Américains, novel, Editions Flammarion 1968
Des Français, novel, Editions Flammarion 1970
La Coloquinte, novel, Editions Flammarion 1971
Manouche, biography of Germaine Germain, Editions Flammarion 1972 (English translations as Manouche by Derek Coltman 1973 & Sam Flores 1974)
L'Enfant Amour, essay, Editions Flammarion 1972
Un Musée de l'Amour, photographs of his collection of pederastic art by Marianne Haas, Editions du Rocher 1972
La Muse Garçonnière, (Musa Paidika) translated of the original Greek, Editions Flammarion 1973
Tableaux de chasse, ou la vie extraordinaire de Fernand Legros, Editions Albin Michel 1976
Propos secrets, memoirs, Editions Albin Michel 1977
Trilogy about Alexander the Great - Editions Albin Michel
La Jeunesse d'Alexandre, 1977
Les Conquêtes d'Alexandre, 1979
Alexandre le Grand, 1981
Propos secrets 2, memoirs, Editions Albin Michel 1980
L'Enfant de cœur, Editions Albin Michel 1978
Roy, novel, Editions Albin Michel 1979
L'Illustre écrivain,  Editions Albin Michel 1982
, presentation and notes by R. Peyrefitte and Pierre Sipriot, Editions Robert Laffont 1983
La Soutane rouge, Edition du Mercure de France 1983
Doucet Louis, raconté par... photographs by Rosine Mazin, Editions Sun 1985
Voltaire, sa jeunesse et son temps, biography, Editions Albin Michel 1985
L' Innominato: Nouveaux Propos Secrets, memoirs, Editions Albin Michel 1989
Voltaire et Frédéric II, Editions Albin Michel 1992
Réflexions sur De Gaulle, Paris, Editions régionales 1991
Le Dernier des Sivry, novel, Editions du Rocher, Monaco 1993
Retours en Sicile, Editions du Rocher, Monaco 1996

References

External links

"The Importance of Being Peyrefitte", an article in Guide Magazine by Roger Moody, May 2002
Roger Peyrefitte: Alexander is my Destiny, by B. John Zavrel, 1996
Ribaldry in Rome — 1957 Time magazine review of The Keys of St. Peter
The Rothschilds & The Mind — 1965 Time magazine review of The Jews
Roger Peyrefitte in the GLBTQ Encyclopedia
Roger Peyrefitte TV appearances at the INA archives
 Peyrefitte obituary in The New York Times

1907 births
2000 deaths
Deaths from Parkinson's disease
French Roman Catholics
French gay writers
Gay diplomats
French LGBT rights activists
LGBT Roman Catholics
French LGBT novelists
French male novelists
Pedophile advocacy
People from Castres
Prix Renaudot winners
Recipients of the Order of Agricultural Merit
Sciences Po alumni
20th-century French male writers
20th-century French novelists
Writers from Occitania (administrative region)
Neurological disease deaths in France
20th-century LGBT people
Anti-Catholicism in France